Oxazolidine is a five-membered ring heterocycle with the formula .The O atom and NH groups are not mutually bonded, in contrast to isoxazolidine. Oxazolidines (emphasis on plural) are derivatives of the parent oxazolidine owing to the presence of substituents on carbon and/or nitrogen. Oxazolines are unsaturated analogues of oxazolidines.

Synthesis and reactions
First synthesized in the 1800's, oxazolidines are traditionally prepared by condensation of 2-aminoalcohols with aldehydes and ketones.  The ready availability of chiral amino alcohols by reduction of amino acids enables the synthesis of chiral oxazolidines.

Oxazolidines are prone to hydrolysis, the reverse of their syntheses.  Perhaps for this reason, their basicity is rarely discussed.

Uses and occurrence
Several oxazolidine derivatives occur naturally, Some occur as post translational modifications of proteins. Others are components of alkaloids, a few of which are highly active against some tumors.  Examples include terazomine, quinocarcin, and tetrahydroisoquinoline.

Oxazolidines are used as moisture scavengers in polyurethane and other systems.

Bisoxazolidines
Bisoxazolidines contain two oxazolidine rings.  They are the saturated analogues of bisoxazolines.

They are used as performance modifiers in polyurethane coatings and paints. The rings hydrolyze in the presence of moisture to give amine and hydroxyl groups, which can then react with diisocyanates, polyisocyanates and polyurethane prepolymers to form a coating. The amine groups will form urea linkages and the hydroxyl group will form urethane links. The use of a bisoxazolidine in a polyurethane system can prevent the unwanted reaction between isocyanate and moisture resulting in coating defects, as a result of carbon dioxide release. This moisture-triggered curing route is preferential to moisture cure. As the ring opening reaction is catalyzed by acids, usually organic acids or anhydrides of carboxylic acids are added in a small amount. 

The choice of linker between the two oxazolidine rings has a large impact on the performance when used to cure isocyanates. A rigid linker group increases a polyurethanes toughness. A flexible linker group imparts flexibility and increases elongation of a coating. These differences are the reason why bisoxazolidines are used to enhance the performance of polyurethane systems. Usually the rings are linked by esters, urethanes, carbonate or have the two rings fused together. A key intermediate in manufacturing bisoxazolidines is 2-[2-(propan-2-yl)-1,3-oxazolidin-3-yl]ethanol. The hydroxy group on the molecule allows for further reaction with hexamethylene diisocyanate for example.

Depending on the linker, bisoxazolines can function as chelating ligands.

See also
 Isoxazolidine, isomeric with oxazolidine.
 Oxazoline, which has only one double bond.
 Isoxazoline, isomeric with oxazoline.
 Oxazolidinedione, which has two in-cycle keto groups (a carbamate and a lactam).
 Oxazolidinone, which has an in-cycle carbamate.
 Dioxooxazolidines are oxazolidines where the carbon centers at the 1 and 3 positions are carbonyls.  Some are commercial fungicides including chlozolinate, vinclozolin, and famoxadone.

Further reading
 Neil G Carter [http://www.chemsoc.org/pdf/gcn/Industrial.pdf OXAZOLIDINE DILUENTS: REACTING FOR THE ENVIRONMENT  Industrial Copolymers Limited.

References